The Open de Cagnes-sur-Mer is a tennis tournament held in Cagnes-sur-Mer, France. Held since 1998, this ITF Circuit event is a $80,000 tournament. It started off being a $10,000 event back in 1998 but has slowly increased the prize money and is played on outdoor clay courts. After many years as a $100,000 tournament, it was downgraded in 2019 to a $80,000 category event.

Past finals

Singles

Doubles

External links
  

Tennis tournaments in France
Clay court tennis tournaments
ITF Women's World Tennis Tour
Recurring sporting events established in 1998